PVH may refer to:

Organisations
 PVH (company), an American clothing company
 Phoenix Venture Holdings, a British automotive company

Places
 Pascack Valley Hospital, a hospital in Westwood, New Jersey, United States
 Poudre Valley Hospital, a hospital in Fort Collins, Colorado, United States
 Governador Jorge Teixeira de Oliveira International Airport (IATA code), in Porto Velho, Brazil

Science and technology
 Paraventricular nucleus of hypothalamus, in anatomy
 Hardware virtual machine guests with paravirtualized drivers (PV-on-HVM or PVH), in the Xen hypervisor